The presidency of George Washington began on April 30, 1789, when George Washington was inaugurated as the first president of the United States, and ended on March 4, 1797.

1789 
 April 30 – First inauguration of George Washington.
 June 1 – The first bill under the Constitution, a measure to regulate the administration of oaths, is passed and signed by George Washington.
 July 4 – The U.S. Congress passes its first bill, setting out tariffs.
 July 27 – The Department of Foreign Affairs (later renamed the Department of State) is established as the first agency of the Federal government of the United States.
 August 7 – The United States Department of War is established.
 August 21 – A proposal for a Bill of Rights is adopted by the United States House of Representatives.
 September 2 – The United States Department of the Treasury is founded.
 September 11 – Alexander Hamilton is appointed as the first United States Secretary of the Treasury.
 September 24 – The Judiciary Act of 1789 establishes the federal judiciary, and the United States Marshals Service.
 September 25 – The United States Congress proposes a set of 12 amendments to the U.S. constitution, for ratification by the states.
 September 26 – Thomas Jefferson, U.S. Minister to France, is appointed as the first Secretary of State.
 September 29 – The U.S. Department of War establishes the nation's first regular army, with a strength of several hundred men.
 October 3 – George Washington issues a Thanksgiving proclamation assigning November 26, 1789, as the first national celebration of Thanksgiving.
 November 21 – North Carolina joins the Union as the 12th State.

1790 
 January 8 – United States President George Washington gives the first State of the Union address, in New York City.
 January 14 – U.S. Secretary of the Treasury Alexander Hamilton submits his proposed plan for payment of American debts, starting with $12,000,000 to pay the foreign debts of the confederation, followed by $40 million for domestic debts, and $21.5 million for the war debts of the states. The plan was narrowly approved 14-12 in the Senate and 34-28 in the House.
 February 1 – In New York City, the Supreme Court of the United States convenes for the first time.
 February 25 – North Carolina cedes its western territories (modern day Tennessee) to the federal government. 
 March 1 – The first United States Census is authorized; it is held later in the year.
 April 10 – The United States patent system is established.
 May 26 – Congress passes an act to govern the creation of states from the "Southwest Territory", from which Tennessee, Alabama, and Mississippi will be formed. 
 May 29 – Rhode Island joins the Union as the 13th State.
 June 20 – Compromise of 1790: Thomas Jefferson, James Madison, and Alexander Hamilton come to an agreement: Madison agrees to not be "strenuous" in opposition for the assumption of state debts by the federal government; Hamilton agrees to support the capital site being above the Potomac.
 July 10 – The U.S. House of Representatives votes, 32–29 to approve creating the District of Columbia from portions of Maryland and Virginia for the eventual seat of government and national capital.
 July 16 – U.S. President George Washington signs the Residence Act into law, establishing a site along the Potomac River as the District of Columbia and the future site of the capital of the United States. The move comes after the bill is narrowly approved on July 1 by the Senate, 14 to 12, and on July 9 by the House, 32 to 29. At the same time, plans are made to move the national capital from New York to Philadelphia until the Potomac River site can be completed.
 July 26 – Alexander Hamilton's Assumption Bill, giving effect to his First Report on the Public Credit, is passed in the United States Congress, allowing the federal government to assume the consolidated debts of the U.S. states.
 August 4 – A newly passed U.S. tariff act creates the system of cutters for revenue enforcement (later named the United States Revenue Cutter Service), the forerunner of the Coast Guard.
 October 20 – The Harmar Campaign ends in a defeat of U.S. Army General Josiah Harmar and Colonel John Hardin by the Western Confederacy of Indians, led by Chief Mihšihkinaahkwa of the Miami tribe and Weyapiersenwah of the Shawnee at Kekionga (now Fort Wayne, Indiana).

1791 
 January 2 – Big Bottom massacre in the Ohio Country, marking the beginning of the Northwest Indian War.
 February 8 – The Bank of the United States, based in Philadelphia, is incorporated by the federal government with a 20-year charter and started with $10,000,000 capital.
 February 21 – The United States opens diplomatic relations with Portugal.
 March 4 – Vermont joins the Union as the 14th State.
 September 9 – The capital of the United States, Washington, D.C., is named after the incumbent 1st President George Washington. 
 November 4 – St. Clair's Defeat, the worst loss suffered by the United States Army in fighting against American Indians, takes place in what is now Mercer County, Ohio.  Miami fighters led by Chief Mihsihkinaahkwa (Little Turtle) and by Shawnee warriors commanded by War Chief Weyapiersenwah (Blue Jacket) rout the forces of General Arthur St. Clair and kill 630 U.S. soldiers, along with hundreds of civilians.

1792 
 February 20 – The Postal Service Act, establishing the United States Post Office Department, is signed by President George Washington.
 April 2 – The Coinage Act is passed, establishing the United States Mint.
 April 5 – United States President George Washington vetoes a bill designed to apportion representatives among U.S. states. This is the first time the presidential veto is used in the United States.
 June 1 – Kentucky joins the Union as the 15th State.
 November 6 – The second United States presidential election is held. Incumbent President George Washington receives all 132 electoral votes for president, and incumbent Vice-President John Adams is re-elected with 77 of 132 votes, with George Clinton receiving 50.
 December 3 – George Washington is re-elected President of the United States.

1793 
 February 13 – A joint session of congress counted the Electoral College votes and elected George Washington to a second term, once again with a unanimous victory.
 February 25 – George Washington holds the first Cabinet meeting as President of the United States.
 March 4 – Second inauguration of George Washington.
 April 22 – George Washington signs the Neutrality Proclamation.

1794 
 January 13 – The U.S. Congress enacts a law providing for, effective May 1, 1795, a United States flag of 15 stars and 15 stripes, in recognition of the recent admission of Vermont and Kentucky as the 14th and 15th states. A subsequent act restores the number of stripes to 13, but provides for additional stars upon the admission of each additional state.
 February 11 – The first session of the United States Senate is open to the public.
 March 4 – The Eleventh Amendment to the United States Constitution is passed by Congress for submission to the states for ratification.
 March 26 – The U.S. lays a 60-day embargo on all shipping to and from Great Britain.
 March 27 – The United States Government authorizes the building of the first six United States Navy vessels (in 1797 the first three frigates,  and  go into service), not to be confused with October 13, 1775, which is observed as the Navy's Birthday.
 March 27 – The U.S. Senate passes a rule ending its policy of closing all of its sessions to the public.
 August 20 – Battle of Fallen Timbers in Northwestern Ohio: American troops under the command of General Anthony Wayne (nicknamed "Mad Anthony") defeat Native American tribes of the Western Confederacy.
 October 4 – In the first and only instance of an incumbent United States president leading men into battle, George Washington arrives at Carlisle, Pennsylvania to guide the U.S. Army's suppression of the Whiskey Rebellion. The rebels soon disperse and the insurrection collapses by the end of the month.
 November 19 – The United States and Great Britain conclude the Jay Treaty, the basis for ten years of peaceful trade between the two nations.
 December 8 – The Great New Orleans Fire (1794) burns over 200 buildings in the French Quarter.

1795 
 February 7 – The Eleventh Amendment to the United States Constitution is passed.
 June 24 – The United States Senate ratifies the Jay Treaty with Great Britain.
 August 3 – The signing of the Treaty of Greenville puts an end to the Northwest Indian War.
 August 14 – President Washington signs the Jay Treaty with Britain on behalf of the United States. 
 September 5 – The United States signs a treaty with the Dey of Algiers, ruled by Baba Hassan, pledging the payment of $23,000 a year tribute to prevent piracy against American ships.
 October 20 – The United States signs a treaty with Spain, opening commerce along the Mississippi River to the Gulf of Mexico, and establishing boundaries between U.S. territory and Spanish Florida. 
 October 27 – The United States and Spain sign the Treaty of Madrid, which establishes the boundaries between Spanish colonies and the U.S.

1796 
 February 29 – Ratifications of the Jay Treaty between Great Britain and the United States are officially exchanged, bringing it into effect.
 March 20 – The U.S. House of Representatives demands that the U.S. State Department supply it with documents relating to the negotiation of the Jay Treaty; President Washington declines the request, citing that only the U.S. Senate has jurisdiction over treaties.
 June 1 – Tennessee joins the Union as the 16th State.
 July 11 – The United States takes possession of Detroit from Great Britain, under the terms of the Jay Treaty.
 September 19 – George Washington's Farewell Address was first published in Philadelphia's American Daily Advertiser.

1797 
 March 4 – Inauguration of John Adams.

References

External links
 George Washington's Mount Vernon
 George Washington Miller Center Presidential Timeline

1789 in the United States
1790 in the United States
1791 in the United States
1792 in the United States
1793 in the United States
1794 in the United States
1795 in the United States
1796 in the United States
1797 in the United States
Presidency of George Washington
Washington, George